Gadolinium oxyorthosilicate (known as GSO) is a type of scintillating inorganic crystal used for imaging in nuclear medicine and for calorimetry in particle physics.

The formula is Gd2SiO5. Its main properties are shown below:

References 

Crystals
Gadolinium compounds
Phosphors and scintillators
Silicates